Ernest Cromwell Beecham (23 July 1906 – 1985) was an English professional footballer who made over 170 appearances in the Football League for Fulham as a goalkeeper. He holds for the club record for consecutive appearances after a debut (130) and his run was only halted by a broken neck suffered in 1928. Beecham also played league football for Queens Park Rangers and Swindon Town.

Personal life 
Beecham attended Cowper School, Hertford.

Career statistics

References

1906 births
1985 deaths
People from Hertford
English footballers
Association football goalkeepers
English Football League players
Hertford Town F.C. players
Fulham F.C. players
Queens Park Rangers F.C. players
Swindon Town F.C. players